A United States Note, also known as a Legal Tender Note, is a type of paper money that was issued from 1862 to 1971 in the U.S. Having been current for 109 years, they were issued for longer than any other form of U.S. paper money. They were known popularly as "greenbacks", a name inherited from the earlier greenbacks, the Demand Notes, that they replaced in 1862. Often termed Legal Tender Notes, they were named United States Notes by the First Legal Tender Act, which authorized them as a form of fiat currency. During the early 1860s the so-called second obligation on the reverse of the notes stated:

By the 1930s, this obligation would eventually be shortened to:

They were originally issued directly into circulation by the U.S. Treasury to pay expenses incurred by the Union during the American Civil War. During the next century, the legislation governing these notes was modified many times and numerous versions were issued by the Treasury.

United States Notes that were issued in the large-size format, before 1929, differ dramatically in appearance when compared to modern American currency, but those issued in the small-size format, starting 1929, are very similar to contemporary Federal Reserve Notes of the same denominations with the distinction of having red U.S. Treasury Seals and serial numbers in place of green ones. Also, while a variety of denominations were issued as United States Notes during the large-size era, only the $1, $2, $5, and $100 denominations were ever issued as small-size notes.

Existing United States Notes remain valid currency in the United States; however, as no United States Notes have been issued since January 1971, they are increasingly rare in circulation and command higher prices than face value as items of numismatic interest.

History

Demand Notes

During 1861, the first year of the American Civil War, the expenses incurred by the Union Government much exceeded its limited revenues from taxation, and borrowing was the main vehicle for financing the war. The Act of July 17, 1861 authorized United States Secretary of the Treasury Salmon P. Chase to raise money via the issuance of $50,000,000 in Treasury Notes payable on demand.  These Demand Notes were paid to creditors directly and used to meet the payroll of soldiers in the field.  While issued within the legal framework of Treasury Note Debt, the Demand Notes were intended to circulate as currency and were of the same size as banknotes and closely resembled them in appearance.  During December 1861, economic conditions deteriorated and a suspension of specie payment caused the government to cease redeeming the Demand Notes as coins.

The Legal Tender Acts
The beginning of 1862 found the Union's expenses increasing, and the government was having trouble funding the escalating war.  U.S. Demand Notes—which were used, among other things, to pay Union soldiers—were unredeemable, and the value of the notes began to deteriorate.  Congressman and Buffalo banker Elbridge G. Spaulding prepared a bill, based on the Free Banking Law of New York, that eventually became the National Banking Act of 1863.

Recognizing, however, that his proposal would take many months to pass Congress, during early February Spaulding introduced another bill to permit the U.S. Treasury to issue  million in notes as legal tender.  This caused tremendous controversy in Congress,  as hitherto the Constitution had been interpreted as not granting the government the power to issue a paper currency. "The bill before us is a war measure, a measure of necessity, and not of choice," Spaulding argued before the House, adding, "These are extraordinary times, and extraordinary measures must be resorted to in order to save our Government, and preserve our nationality." Spaulding justified the action as a "necessary means of carrying into execution the powers granted in the Constitution 'to raise and support armies', and 'to provide and maintain a navy.  Despite strong opposition, President Abraham Lincoln signed the First Legal Tender Act, enacted February 25, 1862, into law, authorizing the issuance of United States Notes as a legal tender—the paper currency soon to be known as "greenbacks".

Initially, the emission was limited to  total face value between the new Legal Tender Notes and the existing Demand Notes. The Act also intended for the new notes to be used to replace the Demand Notes as soon as practical. The Demand Notes had been issued in denominations of $5, $10, and $20, and these were replaced by United States Notes nearly identical in appearance on the obverse. The Demand Notes' printed promise of payment "On Demand" was removed and the statement "This Note is a Legal Tender" was added.

Legal tender status guaranteed that creditors would have to accept the notes despite the fact that they were not backed by gold, bank deposits, or government reserves, and had no interest. However, the First Legal Tender Act did not make the notes an unlimited legal tender as they could not be used by merchants to pay customs duties on imports and could not be used by the government to pay interest on its bonds. The Act did provide that the notes be receivable by the government for short term deposits at 5% interest, and for the purchase of 6% interest 20-year bonds at par. The rationale for these terms was that the Union government would preserve its credit-worthiness by supporting the value of its bonds by paying their interest in gold. Early in the war, customs duties were a large part of government tax revenue and by making these payable in gold, the government would generate the coin necessary to make the interest payments on the bonds. Lastly, by making the bonds available for purchase at par in United States Notes, the value of the latter would be confirmed as well. The limitations of the legal tender status were quite controversial.  Thaddeus Stevens, the Chairman of the House of Representatives Committee of Ways and Means, which had authored an earlier version of the Legal Tender Act that would have made United States Notes a legal tender for all debts, denounced the exceptions, calling the new bill "mischievous" because it made United States Notes an intentionally depreciated currency for the masses, while the banks who loaned to the government got "sound money" in gold. This controversy would continue until the removal of the exceptions during 1933.

As a result of this inflation, the greenback began to trade at a substantial discount from gold, which prompted Congress to pass the short-lived Anti-Gold Futures Act of 1864, which was soon repealed after it seemed to accelerate the decrease of greenback value.

The Union's reliance on expanding the circulation of greenbacks eventually ended with the emission of Interest Bearing and Compound Interest Treasury Notes, and the passage of the National Banking Act. However, the end of the war found the greenbacks trading for only about half of their nominal value in gold. The Secret Service was founded on July 5, 1865, to minimize counterfeiting, which accounted for up to half of the currency.

Post Civil War
At the end of the Civil War, some economists, such as Henry Charles Carey, argued for building on the precedent of non-interest-based fiat money and making the greenback system permanent. However, Secretary of the Treasury McCulloch argued that the Legal Tender Acts had been war measures, and that the United States should soon reverse them and return to the gold standard. The House of Representatives voted overwhelmingly to endorse the Secretary's argument. With an eventual return to gold convertibility in mind, the Funding Act of April 12, 1866 was passed, authorizing McCulloch to retire  million of the Greenbacks within six months and up to  million per month thereafter. This he proceeded to do until only  were outstanding during February 1868. By this time, the wartime economic prosperity was ended, the crop harvest was poor, and a financial panic in Great Britain caused a recession and a sharp decrease of prices in the United States. The contraction of the money supply was blamed for the deflationary effects, and caused debtors to agitate successfully for a halt to the notes' retirement.

As a result, the currency strengthened and by April 1876, the notes were on par with silver coins which then began to re-emerge into circulation. On May 31, 1878, the contraction in the circulation was halted at —a level which would be maintained for almost 100 years afterwards. While  was a significant figure at the time, it is now a very small fraction of the total currency in circulation in the United States. The year 1879 found Sherman, now Secretary of the Treasury, in possession of sufficient specie to redeem notes as requested, but as this brought the value of the greenbacks into parity with gold for the first time since the Specie Suspension of December 1861, the public voluntarily accepted the greenbacks as part of the circulating medium.

While the United States Notes had been used as a form of debt issuance during the Civil War, afterwards they were used as a way of moderately influencing the money supply by the federal government—such as through the actions of Boutwell and Richardson. During the Panic of 1907, President Theodore Roosevelt attempted to increase liquidity in the markets by authorizing the Treasury to issue more Greenbacks, but the Aldrich–Vreeland Act provided for the needed flexibility by the National Bank Note supply instead. Eventually, the perceived need for an elastic currency was addressed with the Federal Reserve Notes authorized by the Federal Reserve Act of 1913, and attempts to alter the circulating quantity of United States Notes ended.

End of the United States Note

Soon after private ownership of gold was banned in 1933 (a ban that would be lifted in 1974), all of the remaining types of circulating currency, National Bank Notes, silver certificates, Federal Reserve Notes, and United States Notes, were redeemable by individuals only for silver. Eventually, even silver redemption stopped in June 1968, during a time in which all U.S. currency (both coins and paper currency) was changed to fiat currency. For the general public, there was then little to distinguish United States Notes from Federal Reserve Notes. United States Notes became rare in hand-to-hand commerce and also beginning in 1966, the Treasury converted the outstanding balance into new  United States Notes, the majority of which sat unissued in bank vaults. Series 1966 and Series 1966A  United States Notes were printed from 1966 to 1969, with distribution into public circulation officially ending  January 21, 1971. In September 1994, the Riegle Improvement Act released the Treasury from its long-standing obligation to keep United States Notes in circulation. Just prior to the Riegle act, the treasury considered releasing its large remaining stockpile of unissued  United States Notes into general circulation, but with the recently redesigned series 1996  Federal Reserve Note, it was decided confusion would likely arise with the sudden appearance of two very different  notes in circulation. The Treasury announced in 1996 that the remaining stock of  United States Notes had been destroyed.

Comparison to Federal Reserve Notes
Both United States Notes and Federal Reserve Notes have been legal tender since the gold recall of 1933. Both have been used in circulation as money in the same way. However, the issuing authority for them came from different statutes. United States Notes are, depending on their issue, redeemable directly for precious metal – as after the specie resumption of 1879 which authorized federal officials  to do so if requested. The difference between a United States Note and a Federal Reserve Note is that a United States Note represented a "bill of credit" and, since it was issued by the government itself and does not involve either lending or borrowing, was inserted by the Treasury directly into circulation free of interest. Federal Reserve Notes are not backed either by precious metals or the full faith of the United States government. The twelve Federal Reserve Banks issue them into circulation pursuant to the Federal Reserve Act of 1913. A commercial bank belonging to the Federal Reserve System can obtain Federal Reserve Notes from the Federal Reserve Bank in its district whenever it wishes. It must pay for them in full, dollar for dollar, by drawing down its account with its district Federal Reserve Bank.

Characteristics

Like all U.S. currency, United States Notes were produced in a large sized format until 1929, at which time the notes' sizes were reduced to the small-size format of the present day. Per the Treasury Department Appropriation Bill of 1929, notes issued before October 1928 were  inches and later issues were to be  inches, which allowed the Treasury Department to produce 12 notes per  inch sheet of paper that previously would yield 8 notes at the old size.

The United States Notes were dramatically redesigned for the Series of 1869, the so-called Rainbow Notes. The notes were again redesigned for the Series of 1874, 1875 and 1878. The final across-the-board redesign of the large-sized notes was the Series of 1880. Individual denominations were redesigned in 1901, 1907, 1917 and 1923.

On small-sized United States Notes, the U.S. Treasury Seal and the serial numbers are printed in red (contrasting with Federal Reserve Notes, where they appear in green). The BEP also printed but did not issue  notes in the 1928 Series. An example was displayed at the 1933 Worlds Fair in Chicago.

Section 5119(b)(2) of Title 31, United States Code, was amended by the Riegle Community Development and Regulatory Improvement Act of 1994 (Public Law 103-325) to read as follows: "The Secretary shall not be required to reissue United States currency notes upon redemption." This does not change the legal tender status of United States Notes nor does it require a recall of those notes already in circulation. This provision means that United States Notes are to be canceled and destroyed but not reissued. This will eventually result in a decrease in the amount of these notes outstanding.

Large-size United States Notes (1862–1923)

Series 1928 United States Notes

Series 1953 United States Notes

Series 1963 United States Notes

Series 1966 United States Notes

Public debt of the United States
, the U.S. Treasury calculates that  million in United States notes are in circulation and, in accordance with debt ceiling legislation, excludes this amount from the statutory debt limit of the United States.  The  million excludes  million in United States Notes issued prior to July 1, 1929, determined pursuant to Act of June 30, 1961, 31 U.S.C. 5119, to have been destroyed or irretrievably lost.

Politics and controversy
The United States Notes were introduced as fiat money rather than the precious metal medium of exchange that the United States had traditionally used.  Their introduction was thus contentious.

The United States Congress had enacted the Legal Tender Acts during the U.S. Civil War when southern Democrats were absent from the Congress, and thus their Jacksonian hard money views were underrepresented.  After the war, the Supreme Court ruled on the Legal Tender Cases to determine the constitutionality of the use of greenbacks.  The 1870 case Hepburn v. Griswold found unconstitutional the use of greenbacks when applied to debts established prior to the First Legal Tender Act as the five Democrats on the Court, Nelson, Grier, Clifford, Field, and Chase, ruled against the Civil War legislation in a 5–3 decision.  Secretary Chase had become Chief Justice of the United States and a Democrat, and spearheaded the decision invalidating his own actions during the war.  However, Grier retired from the Court, and President Grant appointed two new Republicans, Strong and Bradley, who joined the three sitting Republicans, Swayne, Miller, and Davis, to reverse Hepburn, 5–4, in the 1871 cases Knox v. Lee and Parker v. Davis.  In 1884, the Court, controlled 8–1 by Republicans, granted the federal government very broad power to issue Legal Tender paper through the case Juilliard v. Greenman, with only the lone remaining Democrat, Field, dissenting.

The states in the far west stayed loyal to the Union, but also had hard money sympathies.  During the specie suspension from 1862 to 1878, western states used the gold dollar as a unit of account whenever possible and accepted greenbacks at a discount wherever they could.  The preferred forms of paper money were gold certificates and National Gold Bank Notes, the latter having been created specifically to address the desire for hard money in California.

During the 1870s and 1880s, the Greenback Party existed for the primary purpose of advocating an increased circulation of United States Notes as a way of creating inflation according to the quantity theory of money. However, as the 1870s unfolded, the market price of silver decreased with respect to gold, and inflationists found a new cause in the Free Silver movement. Opposition to the resumption of specie convertibility of the Greenbacks during 1879 was accordingly muted.

See also

History of central banking in the United States

Footnotes

Notes

References

Further reading
 Wesley Clair Mitchell, A History of the Greenbacks: With Special Reference to the Economic Consequences of Their Issue, 1862–65. Chicago: University of Chicago Press, 1903.
 Irwin Unger, The Greenback Era: A Social and Political History of American Finance, 1865–1879. (1965)
 Henry George, "On Greenbacks, Free Silver, and Free Banking," The Standard, December 14, 1889.

External links
U.S. Treasury Dept. information about United States Notes
Six Kinds of United States Paper Currency

Freiwirtschaft
Monetary reform
Banknotes of the United States
1862 establishments in the United States
1971 disestablishments in the United States